Kutub Ahmed Mazumder ( – 27 November 2019) was an Indian teacher and politician from Assam belonging to Indian National Congress. He was a member of the Assam Legislative Assembly.

Biography
Mazumder was a Manipuri Muslim. He graduated from Gurucharan College in 1961. He was elected as a member of the Assam Legislative Assembly from Sonai in 2006 as an Indian National Congress candidate. Later, he quit the party and joined All India United Democratic Front. He contested from Silchar in Indian general election, 2014 but he could not win. Later, he joined Indian National Congress again.

Mazumder died of cardiac arrest on 27 November 2019 at the age of 80.

References

2019 deaths
Assam MLAs 2006–2011
All India United Democratic Front politicians
Indian National Congress politicians from Assam
People from Silchar
Indian schoolteachers
Gauhati University alumni
1930s births